Norm Proctor was an Australian rugby league footballer who played from the 1910s to the 1920s. He played in the NSWRFL premiership for North Sydney and Glebe as a fullback.

Playing career
Proctor began his first grade career in 1916 with Glebe before moving to Norths at the end of 1921.  Proctor was a member of the North Sydney team which won their second premiership in 1922 defeating his former club Glebe in the grand final 35–3.  Proctor also played representative football for New South Wales making 5 appearances.  Proctor retired at the end of the 1924 season.

References

North Sydney Bears players
Rugby league fullbacks
Year of death missing
Year of birth missing
Rugby league players from Sydney